The Tenement Max Zweininger is a building located in Bydgoszcz at 2 Foch Street, in the corner with Gdańska Street.

History 
The house was built between 1901 and 1902 for Max Zweininger, the owner of a famous hat manufactory in Bromberg, located on the square. The building was designed by local architect Karl Bergner on the site of an earlier building from the first half of the 19th century.
On the ground floor were established shops, including hats and furs retailers.

In 1910–1911, Max Zweininger had his own department store built by Fritz Weidner, one of the leading architects in Bydgoszcz. The building still stands today at 4 Theater Square.

During interwar period a confectionery shop took the place of the composition of a cigars maker workshop.

In 1940, a ground floor arcade has been added, designed by Jan Kossowski, who also built the Monument on Freedom Square.

Architecture 
The building has a rich ornamental decoration facade and is a symbolic example of the Art Nouveau style in the city. 
Bas-reliefs portrays in particular:
 a sleeping figure
 Flower motifs
 Crowned faces
Balconies are associated with ornamented wrought railings.

Gallery

See also

 Bydgoszcz
 Gdanska Street in Bydgoszcz
 Marshal Ferdinand Foch Street in Bydgoszcz
 Karl Bergner

References

External links
  Various pictures of Bydgoszcz buildings

Bibliography 
  

Buildings and structures on Gdańska Street, Bydgoszcz
Art Nouveau architecture in Bydgoszcz
Art Nouveau apartment buildings
Residential buildings completed in 1902